Wángjiājǐng (王家井) may refer to:

 Wangjiajing, Shenzhou, town in Hebei, China
 Wangjiajing, Zhuji, town in Zhuji, Zhejiang, China